Luigi Gaudiano (born July 3, 1965 in Pagani, Salerno) is a former amateur boxer from Italy. He is best known for winning the bronze medal at the 1987 European Championships in Turin, Italy in the Men's Heavyweight (– 91 kg) division. He represented his native country at the 1988 Summer Olympics in Seoul, South Korea.

References
sports-reference

1965 births
Living people
Heavyweight boxers
Boxers at the 1988 Summer Olympics
Olympic boxers of Italy
Competitors at the 1987 Mediterranean Games
Mediterranean Games silver medalists for Italy
People from Salerno
Italian male boxers
Sportspeople from the Province of Salerno
Mediterranean Games medalists in boxing
20th-century Italian people